Bidens amplissima, also known as the Vancouver Island beggarticks, is an annual wetland species in the Asteraceae family which displays a broad range of morphological variation and has a geographic range restricted to southwestern British Columbia and adjacent Washington State. Due to its limited global range and susceptibility to anthropogenic threats, B. amplissima is federally listed as Special Concern under Canada's Species at Risk Act and is blue-listed in British Columbia. Bidens amplissima shares a variety of morphological characteristics with two closely related species, B. cernua and B. tripartita, making identification challenging. Accurate identification also often depends on multiple morphological characters such as leaf shape, ray florets and achene shape.

Distribution and Abundance 
The global distribution of B. amplissima is restricted southwestern British Columbia and area of adjacent Washington State. Bidens amplissima was thought to be endemic to British Columbia until 2002 when speciemens held at a herbarium in Washington State were found to be originally misidentified as B. cernua and were in fact B. amplissima. Populations are thought to exist in Snohomish County. However, there are no published records on the size of populations in the United States (US).

Although its global geographic range is restricted mainly to British Columbia, more than 85% of its known range, many uncertainties remain regarding the current abundance and distribution. There are some reports of the plant also being found in Manitoba and Nebraska, but these are almost certainly introductions.

As of 2014, B. amplissima has been recorded at 59 locations throughout British Columbia with 27 locations occurring on Vancouver Island. No surveys have been conducted to examine the presence or abundance of B. amplissima within its known range.

Habitat 
Bidens amplissima can often be found at the edges of wetlands, bogs, and tidal areas with fluctuating water levels and often occupies openings at the edges of wetlands. Although B. amplissima most often occurs on the edges of ponds and streams, it can also be found in tidal zones. Lastly, as a hydrophyte, B. amplissima is most prolific in hydric soils.

Morphology

General description 
Bidens amplissima is an annual species growing up to 120 cm (4 feet) tall. Roots are fibrous, stems are rigid and branching.

Stem leaves are opposite, unstalked, and the lower and middle leaves are often deeply three-lobed. However, leaves are also often simple and not lobed. The leaf margin is coarsely toothed or incised, glabrous, and roughly 8–20 cm long.

Bidens amplissima produces numerous yellow flower heads containing both disc florets and ray florets. Ray and disk flowers and occur in a terminal cluster at the top of the plant. Involucral bracts are in two rows, the outer ones about 8–10, leafy, fringed with small hairs, linear-lanceolate with entire margins, up to 7.5 cm long, the inner ones narrowly egg-shaped, 8–12mm long. Ray flowers are 8–11, yellow, 3.5–8mm long, while disk flowers are yellow.

The fruits of Bidens amplissima are achenes which are wedge-shaped with flat or concave summits. Achenes are 5–7mm long, with retrorsely-barbed awns which are 2–4mm long.

Morphological variation 
Bidens amplissima is often confused with two closely related species, B. cernua and B. tripartita. B. amplissima can be distinguished from B. cernua, which has cartilaginous and concave achene summits, globular flower heads, and more numerous petals than B. amplissima. Bidens amplissima can also be separated from B. tripartita, which can be very similar in appearance, however B. tripartita lacks ray petals.

Phylogeny and Genetics 
The current view regarding the phylogenetic history of B. amplissima is that it originated as a hybrid of B. cernua and B. tripartita sometimes after the last glaciation. This view is strongly supported by the morphological traits shared among these species, the small distribution of B. amplissima, and genetic analysis. Despite its relatively recent origins, B. amplissima displays distinct genetics when compared to its parent species.

An examination of Polynesian Bidens by Ganders et al. (2000) also described the ITS base sequences and isozymes of four species from North America. This study strongly indicated that B. amplissima was most closely related to B. cernua and B. tripartita, given that the genetics of these species were almost identical.

Conservation 
Bidens amplissima is Federally listed as Special Concern under Canada's Species at Risk Act. Given that most of its range is restricted to southwestern British Columbia, more than 85% of its known range, conservation and management within the province is crucial to the longevity of the species.

References

External links
South Coast Conservation Program, Vancouver Island Beggarticks, Bidens amplissima 
Angiosperms
Asteraceae
Bidens
Bidens cernua
Bidens tripartita
British Columbia
Pacific northwest
Species at Risk Act

amplissima
Flora of British Columbia
Plants described in 1901